Tylopilus funerarius is a bolete fungus in the family Boletaceae. Found in Singapore, it was described as new to science in 1909 by English mycologist George Edward Massee. He described it as a "sombre, uninviting species, characterised by brownish-black velvety pileus and brown tube and pores", and considered it similar in appearance to Boletus chrysenteron (now Xerocomellus chrysenteron). The species was transferred to the genus Tylopilus in 1981.

References

External links

funerarius
Fungi described in 1909
Fungi of Asia